The 2007–08 New York Islanders season was the 36th season in the franchise's history.

Offseason
Key dates prior to the start of the season:
 The 2007 NHL Entry Draft took place in Columbus, Ohio on June 22–23
 The free agency period began on July 1.

Forward Bill Guerin is named team captain, replacing departed forward Alexei Yashin.

Regular season
Excluding five shootout-winning goals, the Islanders finished the regular season with 189 goals for, the fewest of all 30 teams in the NHL. They also allowed the most shorthanded goals in the NHL, with 15.

Significant events 
An early season highlight occurred on November 3, 2007, when Al Arbour returned to coach his 1,500th game for the Islanders at the behest of Ted Nolan, who wanted Arbour's regular season games coached total to reach 1,500, a round number. The Islanders came from behind to defeat the Pittsburgh Penguins 3–2, which extended Arbour's NHL record for most games coached with one team and extended his NHL record 740 regular season wins with one team. Afterwards, in a post-game ceremony, the Islanders raised a new banner to honor Arbour's 1500th game coached for the Islanders.

On January 22, 2008, the Islanders scored three short-handed goals in a 6–3 win over the Carolina Hurricanes.

Standings

Conference standings

Schedule and results

October 
Record: 5–4–0; Home: 3–2–0; Road: 2–2–0

November 
Record: 8–5–1 ; Home: 6–1–1 ; Road: 2–4–0

December 
Record: 7–7–1 ; Home: 4–4–0 ; Road: 3–3–1

January 
Record: 4–6–4; Home: 0–4–2; Road: 4–2–2

February 
Record: 7–5–1; Home: 4–2–0; Road: 3–3–1

March 
Record: 3–10–1 ; Home: 1–4–1 ; Road: 2–6–0

April 
Record: 1–1–1 ; Home: 0–1–1 ; Road: 1–0–0

Playoffs 

Fans and players had high hopes the 2007-08 season because the team made the playoffs the previous year and were hoping for a playoff clinch repeat. However, the season ended in disappointment as the Islanders missed the playoffs for the first time since the 2005-06 season.

Player statistics

Skaters
Note: GP = Games played; G = Goals; A = Assists; Pts = Points; PIM = Penalty minutes

Goaltenders
Note: GP = Games played; TOI = Time on ice (minutes); W = Wins; L = Losses; OT = Overtime/shootout losses; GA = Goals against; SO = Shutouts; Sv% = Save percentage; GAA = Goals against average

Awards and records

Records

Milestones

Transactions
The Islanders were involved in the following transactions during the 2007–08 season.

Trades

Free agents

Draft picks
New York's picks at the 2007 NHL Entry Draft in Columbus, Ohio.

See also
 2007–08 NHL season

References

New York Islanders seasons
New York Islanders
New York Islanders
New York Islanders
New York Islanders